Frederick Douglas Shepard (June 12, 1916 – December 5, 1999) was an American Negro league outfielder in the 1940s.

A native of Wetumpka, Alabama, Shepard attended Morris Brown College. He made his Negro league debut in 1943 for the Baltimore Elite Giants, then played for the Atlanta Black Crackers through 1944, and the Birmingham Black Barons in 1945 and 1946. Shepard played minor league baseball in 1950 for the Minot Mallards of the Mandak League. He died in Birmingham, Alabama in 1999 at age 83.

References

External links
 and Baseball-Reference Black Baseball stats and Seamheads

1916 births
1999 deaths
Atlanta Black Crackers players
Baltimore Elite Giants players
Birmingham Black Barons players
20th-century African-American sportspeople
Baseball outfielders